Vietnam Fisheries Surveillance ( (KNVN), more specific Cục Kiểm ngư Việt Nam), still alternatively recognized by its former name Vietnam Fisheries Resources Surveillance and also known by its Vietnamese name Kiểm Ngư (KN), is a governmental agency which falls under the management of the Directorate of Fisheries of the Ministry of Agriculture and Rural Development. Formally established on 25 January 2013, it is the non-military special task force responsible for patrolling, checking, controlling, detecting and handling law violations and taking out fishery inspection in the waters that are under the jurisdiction of Vietnam. The agency is expected to coordinate with Vietnam Navy, Vietnam Coast Guard, Vietnam Border Guard and the Vietnam Marititime Self-Defence Militia to help preserve Vietnam's maritime interests, especially in terms of maritime security, illegal fishing and maritime disputes.

Organizational system
 Operations 
 Personnel Department
 Planning and Finance Department 
 Technical Command Department
 Training and International Cooperation Department
 1st, 2nd, 3rd and 4th Regional Commands
 Fisheries Resources Surveillance Information Center

Regional branches
Vietnam Fisheries Resources Surveillance consists of four regional branches under which there are a number of smaller posts.
Fisheries Resources Surveillance Squadron No.1: based in Hai Phong
Fisheries Resources Surveillance Squadron No.2: managed from Da Nang to Ninh Thuận Province; based in Rớ Islet, Khánh Hòa Province. There are three posts: one based in Da Nang on the mainland and two based in Spratly Islands (West Reef and Southwest Cay)
Fisheries Resources Surveillance Squadron No.3: based in Bà Rịa–Vũng Tàu province
Fisheries Resources Surveillance Squadron No.4

Equipment

Vessels 
All vessels are numbered under the format KN-xyz, with the first digit ("x") of the hull number usually refer the squadron that the vessel belongs to. For example, the vessel KN-290 belongs to the Fisheries Surveillance Squadron No.2

Armaments 
Vietnam Fisheries Surveillance is allowed to use:

 Handguns, submachine guns, assault rifles (noticeably the 7.62mm AK), machine guns (noticeably the 12.7mm DShK/NSV and 14.5mm KPV). Approriate to be used with remote controlled weapon stations and any suitable ammunition to the armaments, however the caliber is limited at 14.5mm.
 Non-lethal weapons such as non-lethal guns & ammunition, water cannons (especially noted in the Hai Yang Shi You 981 standoff), laser, tear gas & many non-lethal chemical weapons, baton, handcuffs, armors & self-protection gears.

See also

 Vietnam Directorate of Fisheries

References

Fisheries organizations
Government agencies of Vietnam